Ēdole Parish is an administrative unit of Kuldīga Municipality in the Courland region of Latvia. The parish has a population of 1021 (as of 1/07/2010) and covers an area of 144.49 km2.

History 
In the territory of modern Ēdole parish, Ēdole manor and Post manor were historically located.
In 1935, the area of Ēdole Parish of Ventspils District was 162.5 km² and 2191 inhabitants lived there. In 1945, Selsoviets, the soviet village councils were established in Ēdole, Kāpu and Tērande, but in 1949 they were liquidated. The village of Ēdole belonged to Alsunga (1949-1956) and after 1956 to Kuldīga districts. The village of Ēdole was joined in 1951 by the liquidated Kāpu village and the territory of the Mērurins kolkhoz in the Tērande village, and in 1977 by the liquidated Īvande village. In 1990, the village was reorganized into a parish. In 1992, Īvande Parish separated from Ēdole Parish. In 2009, Ēdole parish was included as an administrative territory in Kuldīga Municipality.

Villages of Ēdole parish 
 Ēdole (parish center)

See also 
 Ēdole Castle

References 

Parishes of Latvia
Kuldīga Municipality
Courland